Phaedranassa cinerea is a species of plant that is endemic to Ecuador.  Its natural habitat is subtropical or tropical moist montane forests. It is threatened by habitat loss.

References

Flora of Ecuador
cinerea
Vulnerable plants
Taxonomy articles created by Polbot